Remember Us to Life is the seventh studio album by singer-songwriter Regina Spektor. On July 22, 2016, Spektor announced that it would be released on September 30, 2016. The lead single of the album is "Bleeding Heart", which is available to listen in full via SoundCloud via Spektor herself.

Overview
On July 12, 2016, Spektor announced on her Facebook page and official website that news would be released in the coming days. On July 22, 2016, Spektor announced that her seventh studio album would be entitled Remember Us to Life. This announcement came with the cover art of the album as well as the lead single and opening track of the album, Bleeding Heart. Additionally it was announced that the album would be available in both a standard edition, featuring 11 songs, and a deluxe edition, featuring all 11 songs of the standard as well as three bonus tracks. The Warner Music store features the album for pre-order in both physical copies and MP3 copies, along with a clear vinyl edition.

Track listing
All tracks written by Regina Spektor.

Personnel
 Leo Abrahams - bass, guitar, percussion, programming, string arrangements, synthesizer, producer
 Jay Bellerose - percussion
 Caroline Buckman - viola
 Giovanna Moraga Clayton - cello
 Jack Dishel - vocals (background)
 Mike Elizondo - bass, double bass
 Judith Hamann - cello
 Songa Lee - violin
 Stella Mozgawa - drums
 Julie Rogers - violin
 Davide Rossi - orchestration, viola, violin
 Nancy Roth - viola
 Andrew Skeet - conductor, string arrangements
 Regina Spektor - celeste, composer, conductor, piano, string arrangements, synthesizer, vocals, co-producer
 Joey Waronker - drums, percussion

Charts

References

External links
http://www.billboard.com/album/7534743/remember-us-to-life

2016 albums
Regina Spektor albums
Albums produced by Leo Abrahams
Sire Records albums
Warner Records albums